Hooverphonic Presents Jackie Cane is the fourth album by the Belgian band Hooverphonic. It is a concept album, telling the story of fictional singer Jackie Cane.  The singles released from this album are "The World Is Mine", "Sometimes" and "One".

The story revolves around the fictitious character Jackie Cane who leaves her identical twin sister in order to become a professional singer. Driven to the brink of insanity by the pressures of fame, Jackie quits show business and returns home to attempt reconciliation with her sister. But, still bitter from years of being put last, her sister kills both of them with a poisoned Last Supper.

Jackie Cane retains the dreamy elements of Hooverphonic's previous works, most notably on songs "Nirvana Blue" and "Human Interest" (which contains references to "Echoes" by Pink Floyd), but tracks like "The World Is Mine" (the first single) and "Day After Day" have a clear Broadway influence and quality to them.  The album went platinum in Belgium and won the group ZAMU's Best Pop/Rock Band and Best Album awards in 2002.

The song "Sometimes" samples the song "Young Man Cried" by The Walker Brothers. "Jackie's Delirium" contains a vocal sample of Zero-G's "Deepest India".

Also in 2003, their song "The World Is Mine" was used as  the theme of the Sky One TV show Mile High.

As of November 2002 the album has sold 100,000 units worldwide.

Track listing
 "Sometimes" (Alex Callier, Scott Engel, John Franz) – 3:59
 "One" (Callier) – 3:21
 "Human Interest" (Callier) – 3:49
 "Nirvana Blue" (Callier) – 4:04
 "The World is Mine" (Geike Arnaert, Callier, Raymond Geerts) – 3:54
 "Jackie's Delirium" (Callier) – 4:09
 "Sad Song" (Callier) – 3:32
 "Day After Day" (Callier) – 2:34
 "Shampoo" (Callier) – 4:10
 "Others Delight" (Arnaert, Callier) – 3:19
 "Opium" (Callier, Geerts) – 3:46
 "The Last Supper" (Callier) – 2:46
 "The Kiss" (Callier) – 2:41

Special edition CD 2

 "2 Wicky" (DJ Pulse Remix) (4:08)
 "Inhaler" (Mr. Pink Remix) (5:46)
 "This Strange Effect" (Thievery Corporation Remix) (4:48)
 "Eden" (Cobble Stone Garden Mix) (5:01)
 "Vinegar & Salt" (Llorca's Half Truth Remix) (5:10)
 "Out Of Sight" (Al Stone Mix) (3:45)
 "Shades" (Original Soundtrack "Shades") (4:55)

Singles

Personnel
 Geike Arnaert – vocals
 Raymond Geerts – guitars
 Alex Callier – bass, programming

Additional musicians
 Simon Clarke – baritone sax, flute
 Tim Sanders – tenor sax
 Roddy Lorimer – trumpet, flügelhorn
 Paul Spong – trumpet, flügelhorn
 Annie Whitehead – trombone
 Dave Stewart – bass trombone
 the London Session Orchestra conducted by Matt Dunkley, led by Gavin Wright
 Scala & Kolacny Brothers

Certifications

References

2002 albums
Concept albums
Hooverphonic albums